Madeira cake is a sponge or butter cake in traditional British and Irish cookery.

Origin 
It is sometimes mistakenly thought to originate from the Madeira Islands; however, that is not the case as it was named after Madeira wine, a Portuguese wine from the islands, which was popular in England in the mid-1800s and was often served with the cake. Madeirans produce their own traditional cake – , a dark, spicy, honey cake – which is very different from Madeira cake. Nowadays, the English Madeira cake is often served with tea or liqueurs.

Cake 
The cake has a firm yet light texture. It is eaten with tea or (occasionally) for breakfast and is traditionally flavoured with lemon. Dating back to an original recipe in the 18th or 19th century, Madeira cake is similar to a  pound cake or yellow cake. One of the earliest published recipes was by Eliza Acton in her Modern Cookery for Private Families (1845):

References 

English cuisine
British cakes
Cakes